Syed Akbar Hussain, popularly known as Akbar Allahabadi (16 November 1846 – 9 September 1921) was an Indian Urdu poet in the genre of satire.

Life and career
Akbar Allahabadi was born in the town of Bara, eleven miles from Allahabad, to a family of Sayyads who originally came to India from Persia as soldiers. His father, Moulvi Tafazzul Hussain served as a Naib Tehsildar and his mother belonged to a zamindar family of Jagdishpur village from the Gaya district in Bihar.

Akbar received his early education from his father at home. In 1855, his mother moved to Allahabad and settled in Mohalla Chowk. Akbar was admitted to the Jamuna Mission School for an English education in 1856, but he abandoned his school education in 1859. However, he continued to study English and read widely.

On leaving school, Akbar joined the Railway Engineering Department as a clerk. While in service, he passed the exam qualifying him as a Vakeel (barrister) and subsequently worked as a Tehsildar and a munsif, and ultimately, as a sessions court judge. To commemorate his work in judicial services, he was bestowed with the title, Khan Bahadur.

Akbar retired in 1903 and lived on in Allahabad. He died of a fever on September 9, 1921 and was buried in Himmatganj district of Allahabad.

Legacy
"Hungama Hai Kyon Barpa" is a popular ghazal, written by Akbar Allahabadi and most prominently sung by Ghulam Ali. Verses from his poetry also found their way into the famous qawwali “Tum ik Gorakh Dhanda Ho” by Nusrat Fateh Ali Khan. A number of Akbar Allahabadi's poems were used in the 2015 Hindi film Masaan. Explaining this as a conscious tribute, the film's lyrics writer Varun Grover explained that he wanted to show one of the female leads Shaalu (played by Shweta Tripathi) as a person whose hobby is to read Hindi poetry and Shayri.

References

External links
Akbar Allahabadi at Kavita Kosh (Hindi)
A few of Akbar Allahabadi's ghazals

Indian male poets
Urdu-language poets from India
19th-century Indian Muslims
Writers from Allahabad
1846 births
1921 deaths
Urdu-language writers from British India
20th-century Urdu-language writers
19th-century Urdu-language writers
Urdu-language religious writers
Urdu-language letter writers
Urdu-language theologians
19th-century Indian poets
20th-century Indian poets
Poets from Uttar Pradesh
19th-century Indian male writers
20th-century Indian male writers